Mochlosoma is a genus of bristle flies in the family Tachinidae. There are about five described species in Mochlosoma.

Species
Mochlosoma adustum Reinhard, 1958
Mochlosoma anale Giglio-Tos, 1893
Mochlosoma demissum Reinhard, 1958
Mochlosoma duplare Reinhard, 1958
Mochlosoma furtum Reinhard, 1958
Mochlosoma illocale Reinhard, 1958
Mochlosoma indutile Reinhard, 1958
Mochlosoma lacertosum (Wulp, 1891)
Mochlosoma laudatum Reinhard, 1958
Mochlosoma mexicanum (Macquart, 1851)
Mochlosoma opipare Reinhard, 1958
Mochlosoma rufipes Coquillett, 1902
Mochlosoma russulum Reinhard, 1958
Mochlosoma sabroskyi Reinhard, 1958
Mochlosoma sarcinale Reinhard, 1958
Mochlosoma sericeum Giglio-Tos, 1893
Mochlosoma serotinum Reinhard, 1958
Mochlosoma validum Brauer & von Bergenstamm, 1889

References

Dexiinae
Diptera of North America
Tachinidae genera
Taxa named by Friedrich Moritz Brauer
Taxa named by Julius von Bergenstamm